Ricardo Marmolejo Álvarez (born March 29, 1954) is a two-time Olympic swimmer from Mexico. He swam for the Mexico National Swim Team at the 1972 and 1976 Olympics.

He is the father of 3-time Olympian Adriana Marmolejo; his son Pablo has also been a member of Mexico's swimming national team.

Marmolejo swam collegiately in the US for University of Texas.

As a coach, Marmolejo placed a swimmer in the Olympic Games of 1992, 1996, 2000, 2004, 2008. He was the head coach of Mexico's Olympic Team in 2008. His current team, Marmo Nadadores are the 2014 State of Mexico Age Group Champions. He is the resident coach at the Comite Olympico Mexicano in Mexico City.

References

1954 births
Living people
Mexican male swimmers
Texas Longhorns men's swimmers
Swimmers at the 1971 Pan American Games
Swimmers at the 1972 Summer Olympics
Swimmers at the 1975 Pan American Games
Swimmers at the 1976 Summer Olympics
Olympic swimmers of Mexico
Pan American Games silver medalists for Mexico
Pan American Games bronze medalists for Mexico
Pan American Games medalists in swimming
Competitors at the 1974 Central American and Caribbean Games
Central American and Caribbean Games gold medalists for Mexico
Central American and Caribbean Games medalists in swimming
Medalists at the 1971 Pan American Games
Medalists at the 1975 Pan American Games
20th-century Mexican people
21st-century Mexican people